Beaubien station is a Montreal Metro station in the borough of Rosemont—La Petite-Patrie in Montreal, Quebec, Canada. It is operated by the Société de transport de Montréal (STM) and serves the Orange Line. The station opened on October 14, 1966, as part of the original network of the Metro.

Overview 
The station, designed by Roger d'Astous, is a normal side platform station, built in tunnel. The large entrance structure contains the ticket barrier, as well as a light shaft and an open sided bus shelter. Noted ceramicist Claude Vermette collaborated on the tile designs.

Origin of the name
This station is named for Beaubien Street, named for a prominent French-Canadian family of landholders, public figures, and professionals.

Connecting bus routes

Station improvements
Beaubien station was closed from May 4 to August 30, 2015 for station modernization. This included refurbishing structural slabs, floor finishes and the entrance building's waterproofing membrane, installing a new ventilation shaft, replacing light fixtures and granite stairs, repairing and replacing wall panels and floor slabs, replacing walkway edges and sidewalks, and adding trees and shrubs. Shuttle buses operated between Rosemont and Jean-Talon to serve the station.

Construction in 2020 to demolish and rebuild the skylight dome located near De Saint-Vallier to ensure that the ceiling is waterproof was completed in winter 2021.

Nearby points of interest

Plaza Saint-Hubert
Canadian Citizenship Court
CLSC La Petite Patrie
Esperanto Society of Quebec

References

External links

Beaubien Station - official site
Montreal by Metro, metrodemontreal.com - photos, information, and trivia
 2011 STM System Map
 Metro Map

Orange Line (Montreal Metro)
Rosemont–La Petite-Patrie
Railway stations in Canada opened in 1966
Roger D'Astous buildings
1966 establishments in Quebec
Beaubien-Casgrain family